O'Neil is an unincorporated community in Nassau County, Florida, United States. It is located on State Road 200, to the east of Yulee and the west of Fernandina Beach, between Lanceford Creek and Kingsley Creek.

Geography
O'Neil is located at  (30.6172, -81.5144).

References

Unincorporated communities in Nassau County, Florida
Unincorporated communities in the Jacksonville metropolitan area
Unincorporated communities in Florida